The Outlaw Express is a lost 1926 American silent Western film directed by Leo D. Maloney and starring Leo D. Maloney, Joan Renee and Melbourne MacDowell.

Cast
 Leo D. Maloney as Miles Wayburn 
 Joan Renee as Ann Townsend 
 Melbourne MacDowell as Sheriff 
 Al Hart as Carl Larson
 Henry Otto as John Mills 
 Paul Hurst as Secretary 
 Bud Osborne as 'Blackie' Lewis 
 Eva Thatcher as Ma Hemstetter 
 Nelson McDowell as 'Chaw' Egan 
 Fred Burns as 'Borax' Jones 
 Frank Ellis as Scott

References

Bibliography
 Munden, Kenneth White. The American Film Institute Catalog of Motion Pictures Produced in the United States, Part 1. University of California Press, 1997.

External links
 
 lobby card

1926 films
1926 Western (genre) films
Films directed by Leo D. Maloney
1920s English-language films
Pathé Exchange films
American black-and-white films
Lost American films
Lost Western (genre) films
1926 lost films
Silent American Western (genre) films
1920s American films